Cassinasco is a comune (municipality) in the Province of Asti in the Italian region Piedmont, located about  southeast of Turin and about  southeast of Asti.

Cassinasco borders the following municipalities: Bubbio, Calamandrana, Canelli, Monastero Bormida, Rocchetta Palafea, and Sessame.

Demographic evolution

References

External links
 www.comune.cassinasco.at.it/

Cities and towns in Piedmont